Tara may refer to:

Arts and entertainment

Film and television
Tara (1992 film), an Indian film directed by Bijaya Jena
Tara (2001 film), an American film, also known as Hood Rat, directed by Leslie Small
Tara (2010 film), a Bengali film directed by Bratyo Basu
Tara (2013 film), an Indian film directed by Kumar Raj
Tara (TV series), soap opera that aired on Zee TV
TARA, acronym for The Amazing Race Asia, a reality game show on the AXN network

Music
T-ara, a South Korean girl music group 
Tara Music, a label featuring traditional Irish music
Tara (Absu album)
"Tara" (song), a song on Moya Brennan's 2003 album Two Horizons
Tara (Yano album)
 "Tara", a song by Roxy Music on the 1982 album Avalon (Roxy Music album)

Fictional settings
Tara (plantation), fictional home of Scarlett O'Hara in Gone with the Wind
Tara, a planet, setting of the Doctor Who serial The Androids of Tara
Tara, a fictional town, the setting for the 1970 film The Spider's Stratagem

Biology
Tara (plant), a genus of legumes
Tara (spider), a genus of jumping spiders
Tara tree (Caesalpitarania spinosa), native to Peru
Tara, a Malagasy name for the shrub Lemuropisum edule
Tara, a theoretical founding ancestor of Haplogroup T
A Vitis rotundifolia grape variety
Tara, Māori for the White-fronted tern (Sterna striata)
Tara, a Chinese name for Calamus erectus

Companies and media
Țara, a newspaper from the Republic of Moldova
Tara Air, a Nepalese airline 
Tara International, Indian marketer for Tara Green Auto
Tara Labs, a manufacturer of high-end audio products
Tara Muzik, a defunct Indian Bengali music channel
Tara Newz, a defunct Indian Bengali news channel
Tara Television (or Tara TV), an Irish cable and satellite channel

People
Şarık Tara (born 1930), Turkish billionaire and former captain of industry
Tara (given name), including a list of people and fictional characters
Tara (Kannada actress), stage name of Indian actress and politician Anuradha
Tara (wrestler), ring name of professional wrestler Lisa Marie Varon
Tara the Southern Belle, a member of the Southern Belles tag-team from the Gorgeous Ladies of Wrestling

Places

Natural features
Tara (river), in Montenegro and Bosnia and Herzegovina (in Republic Srpska)
Tara (Irtysh), river in Russia (in Novosibirsk and Omsk Oblasts), a tributary of the Irtysh
Tara, an older name for the river Tragus, in Greece (in Arcadia)
Tara, Saga, town, mountain and mountain range in Japan (in Saga Prefecture)
Tara Mountain, Serbia
Tara National Park, Serbia
Tara Island, Sulu Archipelago, Philippines
Tara Hill, County Wexford, Ireland, a hill and a village
Hill of Tara, County Meath, Ireland, a ritual site of ancient high kings of Ireland
Salar de Tara, a salt pan in Chile
5863 Tara, an asteroid

Populated places

Africa
"Tara", Cairo, a squatted villa on Gezira Island, Cairo, Egypt, made notorious by its SOE occupants during World War II
Tara, Zambia, a village in the Southern Province of Zambia
Tara Subcounty, a region in Maracha District, Uganda

Asia
Tara, Iran, a village in Mazandaran Province
Tara, Nepal, a village in Baglung District in the Dhawalagiri Zone of central Nepal
Tara, Russia, several inhabited localities
Tara, Saga, a town, mountain, and mountain range in Saga Prefecture, Japan

Australia
Tara, Northern Territory, a locality in the Barkly Region
Tara, Queensland, a town
Tara County, New South Wales
Shire of Tara, Queensland

Europe
Hill of Tara, an ancient site in County Meath, Republic of Ireland
Tara, County Down, a townland in the civil parish of Witter, County Down, Northern Ireland
Tara, County Offaly, a townland in the civil parish of Durrow, barony of Ballycowan, Republic of Ireland

North America
Tara, Florida, United States, an unincorporated area
Tara, Ontario, village in Canada
Tara Township, Minnesota (disambiguation), several places in the United States

Religion
In Hinduism:
 Tara (Mahavidya), a Tantric goddess
 Tara (Ramayana), the wife of the monkey king Vali
 Tara (Hindu goddess), the wife of Brihaspati
Tara (Buddhism), a tantric meditation deity in Tibetan Buddhism
Tara, a sea goddess in Polynesian mythology
Tara (Greek mythology)

Schools
Tara Anglican School for Girls, North Parramatta, New South Wales, Australia
Tara High School, Baton Rouge, Louisiana, United States
Tara Institute, a Tibetan Buddhist center in Melbourne, Australia

Titles
Baron Brabazon of Tara, a UK title
Baron Tara, an Irish title
Kingship of Tara, a title in ancient Ireland
Viscount Tara, an Irish title

Transportation
Tara Air, a Nepalese airline 
Tara Field, an airport in Georgia, United States
Tara Station, a railway station in Saga Prefecture, Japan
Tara Street, a major traffic route in Dublin, Ireland
Tara Street railway station in Dublin, Ireland

Other uses
Đurđevića Tara Bridge, a bridge over the Tara River in northern Montenegro
Tārā, Tahitian slang for 5 CFP francs
Tara (cat), a family cat who saved a four-year-old boy from a dog attack
Tara (Northern Ireland), a loyalist group
Tara, Chertsey, a house in Surrey, UK, previously the home of drummer Keith Moon
Tara Brooch, an artifact from Ireland
Tara Foundation, a charity for transgender people
Tara Hurdle, a horse race in Ireland
Tara Mine, a zinc and lead mine near Navan, County Meath, Ireland
Tara Theatre, an art house movie theater in Atlanta named after the plantation in Gone With the Wind
Timed antagonistic response alethiometer, a type of lie detection technique
Tāra, Māori language name for New Zealand dollar
Yugoslav submarine Nebojša, or Tara, a submarine of the Yugoslav Navy

See also
Battle of Tara (disambiguation), a number of battles
Golden Tara, a Majapahit period (Indonesia) gold image of a Hindu goddess
Hurricane Tara (disambiguation), three tropical cyclones in the Eastern Pacific Ocean

Taras (disambiguation)
Taara or Tharapita, a god in Estonian mythology
Terah, a biblical figure
Tera (disambiguation)
Terra (disambiguation)